Pyrus phaeocarpa, the dusky pear or orange pear, is a species of flowering plant in the family Rosaceae, native to the Loess Plateau of northern China. A wide tree reaching at most  in height, it is hardy to USDA zone 5, or perhaps even zone 4. Its small yellow to brown fruit are edible, and its Autumn foliage is bright orange to orange-red, giving it good potential as an ornamental. Its chloroplast genome shows that it is closely related to Pyrus pashia, the wild Himalayan pear, and it is suspected to be a hybrid of P.betulifolia, the birchleaf pear, P.pyrifolia, the apple pear, and P.ussuriensis, the Manchurian pear.

References

phaeocarpa
Trees of China
Endemic flora of China
Flora of Xinjiang
Flora of North-Central China
Plants described in 1915